The Jose and Gertrude Anasola House near Shoshone, Idaho, United States, was built in  by stonemason Ignacio Berriochoa.  It is a stone house with a shallow pyramid roof.  Its front wall is built of dressed stone and a light plastering does not conceal the stonework.  It was listed on the National Register of Historic Places on September 8, 1983, as a part of the Lava Rock Structures in South Central Idaho Thematic Resource.

It was home of a Basque family, Jose and Gertrude Anasola, who operated a Basque boardinghouse nearby.

References

Houses in Lincoln County, Idaho
Houses completed in 1913
Houses on the National Register of Historic Places in Idaho
1913 establishments in Idaho
National Register of Historic Places in Lincoln County, Idaho
Lava rock buildings and structures